Gaston Van Laere (born 6 December 1890, date of death unknown) was a French water polo player. He competed in the men's tournament at the 1912 Summer Olympics.

References

1890 births
Year of death missing
French male water polo players
Olympic water polo players of France
Water polo players at the 1912 Summer Olympics
Sportspeople from Tourcoing